Belhare, also known as Athpariya II (not to be confused with Athpariya I), is a Kirati language spoken by some 2,000 people living on Belhara Hill, at the southern foothills of the Himalayas situated in the Dhankuta District, Koshi Province in eastern Nepal. All speakers of Belhare are bilingual in Nepali, which results in frequent code mixing and a large amount of Nepali loan-words. Nevertheless, the grammar of Belhare has maintained its distinct Kiranti characteristics.

Like other Kiranti languages, Belhare is characterized by an elaborate morphology in both the nominal and verbal domain. Syntactically, Belhare has partly an accusative, partly an ergative pivot, but accusative syntax is more prominent in terms of frequency.

Phonology
The phonemes in parentheses only occur in loanwords from Nepali.

Consonants

Vowels

References

Bickel, Balthasar. 1993. “Belhare subordination and the theory of topic.” In: Karen H. Ebert (ed.): Studies in clause linkage. Papers from the First Köln-Zürich Workshop. Zürich: ASAS
Bickel, Balthasar. 1996. Aspect, Mood, and Time in Belhare. Studies in the Semantics-Pragmatics Interface of a Himalayan Language. Zürich: Universität Zürich (ASAS - Arbeiten des Seminars für Allgemeine Sprachwissenschaft, 15)
Bickel, Balthasar. 1999. “Cultural formalism and spatial language in Belhara.” In: Balthasar Bickel & Martin Gaenszle (eds.): Himalayan Space: cultural horizons and practices. Zürich: Museum of Ethnography. 73-101
Bickel, Balthasar. 2000. “Grammar and social practice: on the role of ‘culture’ in linguistic relativity.” In: Susanne Niemeier & René Dirven (eds.): Evidence for Linguistic Relativity. Amsterdam: Benjamins. 161-92
Bickel, Balthasar. 2003. “Belhare.” Graham Thurgood & Randy J. LaPolla (eds.). The Sino-Tibetan Languages. London: Curzon Press. 546-70

External links
A short introduction to Belhare and its speakers

Kiranti languages
Languages of Nepal
Languages of Koshi Province